Aryan or Arian is the first Persian pop band consisting of both male and female singers and players in Iran after the Iranian Revolution. Pahlavan and Salehi are the band's lead vocalists, and the songwriters are Pahlavan, Salehi, Amirkhas, Khahani and Farnejad. Their second, third and fourth albums were the bestselling albums of their release years. They are the first Iranian band to feature in the "International Who's Who in Music". They have released four albums, and played concerts around the globe. They donate part of their profits to the "United Nations World Food Programme".

Albums
Their debut album, Gole Aftabgardoon (The Sunflower) was released in 2000. The album had huge success in Iran and between the Persian communities across the globe.  The lyrics were simple, nice and different from the prior bands and singers, and the music had a positive feeling.

Their second album, however, had more complex lyrics. It was named Va Amma, Eshgh (And Now, Love) and released in 2001. The lyrics were again alternative and different, and in the first song, the fantasies of love are being criticized and described as "The Childish Tales".
It took three years to release the third album, Till Eternity..., released in 2004 and they started to show their music to the rest of the world and were nominated for BBC World Music awards recently. The band has become so popular that more than 54,000 tickets to one of their concerts were sold in less than six hours. 

In a recent interview with BBC they said, "Now we have a responsibility, we should be better and introduce ourselves all over the world. "If you go to Iranian movies all you see is misery - nothing else. People think Iran is like this - everything is a desert, all the people are crying.... We wanted to show the real Iran".

In 2008, they released their fourth album Bi to Ba to and they worked together with Chris de Burgh and produced an English-Persian version of de Burgh's song "The Words I Love You" (A light for eternity).

In 2009, Arian released a single called  "Here Comes Nowrouz, Here Comes Spring" for the Iranian new year.

In 2010, they released a single called "The Footsteps of Hope" for United Nations World Food Programme (WFP) and received a Certificate of Appreciation from WFP.

Mohammad Reza Golzar, a famous actor and model, used to be one of the guitarists and soloists for the group.

Current members
 Ali Pahlavan (Vocals & Guitar)
 Payam Salehi (Vocals & Guitar)
 Ninef Amirkhas (Keyboard) (studying in the United States)
 Siamak Khahani (Violin)
 Alireza Tabatabaee (Drum)
 Borzou Badihi (Percussion) (lives on Kish Island)
 Sharareh Farnezhad (Guitar, Chorus)
 Sahar Kashmari (Chorus)
 Sanaz Kashmari (Chorus)

Guest players
 Farzad Fakhreddini (Electric Guitar)
 Dara Daraei (Bass Guitar)
 Shahab Hosseini (Keyboard)
 Alireza Miraqa (Percussion)
 Amid Bonakdar (Bass Guitar)

Former guest players
 Tirdad Keshavarzi (Electric Guitar) - Tehran Milad Hall (Tehran International Fair)
 Saman Emami (Electric Guitar)- Tehran S'ad Abad Palace.
 Milad Zendeh Naam (Electric Guitar) - Dubai
 Babak Akhoundi (Electric Guitar)- Uk, Germany Tour

Guest players in albums
 Abbas Sadeqi (Electric Guitar)
 Babak Akhoundi (Electric Guitar)
 Fleming Khoshqadami (Harmonica)
 Farzad Fakhreddini (Electric Guitar)
 Jaber Eta'ati (Accordion)

Discography

Albums
Gole Aftabgardoon (گل آفتابگردون) (2000)
Va Amma Eshgh (2001) (و اما عشق)
Ta Binahayat (2004) (تا بی نهایت)
Bi To Ba To (2008) (بی تو با تو)
Khoda Hafez (2015) (خداحافظ)

Singles 
"Here Comes Nowrooz, Here Comes Spring" (2009) (عيد اومد بهار اومد)
"The Footsteps of Hope" (2010) (صدای پای اميد)
"Seven" (2010) (هفت)
"Since You Have Gone" (2010) (از روزی که رفتی)
"Miss You Lots" (2010) (تو رو کم دارم)
"Flight-Club Mix" (2010) (پرواز - کلاب میکس)

Videography
 Arian Band - Parvaz
 The Words I Love You - (HD Quality DVD)

References

External links 

 
 
 Arian on Spotify

Iranian pop music groups
Musical groups from Tehran